List of Governors, Deputy Governors, Residents, Lieutenant-Governor of the Presidency and Residency versions of British Bencoolen.

List
This is a list, source from worldstatesmen.org

Deputy Governors
Subordinated to Madras Presidency
 1685: Ralph Ord
 1685 - 1690: Benjamin Bloom
 1690 - 1691: James Sowdon
 1691 - 1695: Charles Fleetwood
 1695 - 1696: Charles Barwell
 1696 - 1699: Matthew Mildmay
 1699 - 1700: Robert Broughton
 1700 - 17 Dec 1705: Richard Watts
 1705 - 1708: Matthew Ridley
 1708: James Cross
 1708: Abraham Hoyle
 1708: John Delapie 
 1708 - 1710: Robert Skingle
 1710: Jeremiah Harrison (Supervisor)
 1710 - 1711: Anthony Ettricke
 1711 - 1712: John Daniell
 1712 John Hunter
 1712 - 1716: Joseph Collett - On 1 September 1712, Collett arrived at York Fort in Bencoolen in Sumatra and was subsequently appointed Governor.
 1716 - 1717: Theophilus Shyllinge
 1717 - 1718: Richard Farmer
 1718 - 1719: Thomas Cooke (Supervisor)
 1719 - 1723: Isaac Pyke
 1723: Thomas Dunster
 1723 - 1728: Joseph Walsh
 1728 - 1730: Nicholas Morse
 1730 - 1731: Stephen Newcome
 1731 - 1736: Francis Everest
 1736 - 1746: Robert Lennox                     
 1746 - 1752: Joseph Hurlock
 1752 - 1754: Robert Hindley 
 1754 - 1755: John Walsh (Supervisor) 
 1755       : John Pybus
 1755 - 1756: Thomas Combes
 1757 - 1758: Randolph Marriott
 1758 - 2 April 1760: Roger Carter
 2 Apr 1760 - 1760: Charles Henri Hector d'Estaing (French Commander)

Governors of Bencoolen Presidency
Feb 1762 - Jul 1762: Samuel Ardley (acting)  
1760 - 1767: Roger Carter
1767 - 1776: Richard Wyatt
1776: Robert Hay
1776 - 1780: William Broff
1780 - 1781: Hew Steuart
1781 - 1785: Edward Coles

In 1785, Bencoolen became a Residency, within the Bengal Presidency

Deputy Governors of Bencoolen
1785 - 1786: John Crisp (1st time) 
1786 - 1787: Thomas Palmer 
1787 - 1789: George Salmon (Supervisor)
1789 - 1793: John Crisp (2nd time)
1793 - 1799: Robert Broff
1799: John Crisp (3rd time)
1799 - 1800: Philip Braham (acting)
1800 - 1805: Walter Ewer

Residents of Bencoolen
April 1805 - 23 December 1807: Thomas Parr
1808 - 1810: Richard Parry
1810 - 1812: William Parker
1812 - 22 Mar 1818: George John Siddons

Lieutenant-Governor of Bencoolen
1818 - 1824: Stamford Raffles -  who enacted major reforms, including the abolishment of slavery, as well as founding of Singapore.

Resident of Bencoolen
1824 - 1 Mar 1825: John Prince

References

External links
 http://www.worldstatesmen.org/Indonesia.htm#Bencoolen
Bencoolen